Maryland House of Delegates District 27B is one of the 67 districts that compose the Maryland House of Delegates. Along with subdistricts 27A and 27C, it makes up the 27th district of the Maryland Senate. District 27B includes parts of Calvert County and Prince George's County, and is represented by one delegate.

Demographic characteristics
As of the 2020 United States census, the district had a population of 45,496, of whom 35,379 (77.8%) were of voting age. The racial makeup of the district was 22,804 (50.1%) White, 16,887 (37.1%) African American, 178 (0.4%) Native American, 912 (2.0%) Asian, 47 (0.1%) Pacific Islander, 1,252 (2.8%) from some other race, and 3,431 (7.5%) from two or more races. Hispanic or Latino of any race were 2,847 (6.3%) of the population.

The district had 35,750 registered voters as of October 17, 2020, of whom 5,730 (16.0%) were registered as unaffiliated, 10,295 (28.8%) were registered as Republicans, 19,097 (53.4%) were registered as Democrats, and 449 (1.3%) were registered to other parties.

History
District 27B represented parts of Anne Arundel County and Calvert County up until the 1998 election. From the election of 2002 to the election of 2010, District 27B represented only Calvert County.

Past Election Results

1998

2002

2006

2010

2014

2018

References

27B